Wallace L. Daniel Jr. is an American historian, currently the Provost and a Distinguished University Professor at Mercer University. Previously, Daniel was the Ralph L. and Mae Lynn Professor of History at Baylor University and the Dean of Baylor's College of Arts and Sciences from 1996 to 2005.

Education
Ph.D. in History, University of North Carolina
B.A. in Economics, with Honors, University of North Carolina
Slavic Languages Institute, Indiana University (2 times)

References

Year of birth missing (living people)
Living people
Baylor University faculty
Mercer University faculty
21st-century American historians
American male non-fiction writers
University of North Carolina at Chapel Hill alumni
21st-century American male writers